Paracito is a district of the Santo Domingo canton, in the Heredia province of Costa Rica.

Geography 
Paracito has an area of  km2 and an elevation of  metres.

Demographics 

For the 2011 census, Paracito had a population of  inhabitants.

Transportation

Road transportation 
The district is covered by the following road routes:
 National Route 220
 National Route 307
 National Route 308

References 

Districts of Heredia Province
Populated places in Heredia Province